Christian von Steven (19 January 1781, in Fredrikshamn, Vyborg Governorate – 30 April 1863, in Simferopol, Crimea) was a Finnish-born Russian botanist and entomologist.

Life
Steven was of Swiss descent.

At the age of 57 he married a young widow, Marie Karlovna Gartzewitsch (née Hagendorff), with whom he had five children:
Anton (b. 12 December 1835) - a Lieutenant in the Russian Navy, present at the Siege of Sevastopol (1854–1855)
Julia (24 August 1837 – 1855)
Natalia (27 August 1839 – 1862) - married Lieutenant Colonel Hippenreiter 
Alexander (1844-1910)
Katharina (b. 16 August 1841)

Career
He studied at the Royal Academy of Turku, Sweden, now Finland, and at Jena, Germany, before studying medicine at Saint Petersburg University.

The senior Russian sericulture (silk farming) inspector Friedrich August Marschall von Bieberstein employed Steven as his assistant in 1800. He inspected sericulture in the Caucasus, progressing to deputy senior inspector of sericulture in 1806.

In 1812, he participated in the creation of the Nikitsky Botanical Garden at Nikita in Crimea, which he directed until 1827. After von Bieberstein's death in 1826 Steven was appointed senior inspector of sericulture in southern Russia, and Nicolai Anders von Hartwiss became director of the Botanical Garden, with Steven remaining as supervisor. He retired in 1850.

In 1815, he was elected a corresponding member of the Royal Swedish Academy of Sciences.

In his later life Steven studied the flora of Crimea, where he settled, but he had also collected numerous specimens from the Lower Volga area at the start of his career.

Expeditions
In the spring 1800 von Bieberstein and Steven departed from Saint Petersburg to Moscow, where they stayed for several weeks with Christian Friedrich Stephan the director of the Moscow Apothecary garden and professor of chemistry and botany at the Medical-Surgical Academy.

They made their way to Kizlyar, collecting in Astrakhan, Sarepta, and between the Volga and the Don Rivers.

In 1806 Steven visited the Lower Volga again, including Sarepta, Saratov, Norka and the area between the Volga and Medveditsa Rivers.

In 1807 Steven moved to Simferopol, Crimea, but returned to Sarepta and Kamyshin in 1811, and Astrakhan in 1816.

New taxa from the Lower Volga

On these excursions he collected material which was described by other botanists. Allium sabulosum was described by Alexander von Bunge, whereas Adonis volgensis and Delphinium cuneatum were described by Augustin Pyramus de Candolle in 1818.

Collaborations

He was an active member of the Imperial Society of Naturalists of Moscow.

The botanist Robert Lyall said "one of the first naturalists of the age [is] Mr Christian Steven who after having travelled in the Caucasus Georgia and the Crimea has been appointed director of the botanic garden at Nikita on the southern coast where he spends several months in the year "

He met Carl Reinhold Sahlberg when Sahlberg travelled to St. Petersburg in 1813 to collect specimens for Åbo Akademi's Botanical Museum and Gardens.

Steven's letters written in 1828–1863 to professor Alexander von Nordmann are maintained in the archives of Finnish national library. Some letters are also at the central archive of Simferopol and at Geneva library in Switzerland.

Awards
In 1849, to celebrate 50 years of service, he was elected Honourable Member of all Russian Universities and Academies of Sciences

Order of Saint Anna, Second Class
Order of St. Vladimir, Third Class (Russia)

Works
 Monographia Pedicularis, 1822.
 Verzeichnis der auf der taurischen Halbinsel wildwachsenden Pflanzen, 1856–1857.
A review of the success of sericulture, horticulture and wine-making in the midday provinces of Russia (1834-1835). Magazine of the Ministry of Internal Affairs. 1835. T. XV. N 2. P. 301.
A review of the success of sericulture, horticulture and wine-making in the midday provinces of Russia (1835-1836). Magazine of the Ministry of Internal Affairs. 1836. T. XX. N 4. P. 46.
A review of the success of sericulture, horticulture and wine-making in the midday provinces of Russia (1836-1837), Magazine of the Ministry of Internal Affairs. 1837. T. XXIII. Part 3. P. 469-471

Legacy
He collected an important herbarium of more than 23,000 species which he donated in 1860 to the Botanical Museum of the University of Helsinki. Other specimens are kept at herbaria LE, MW, and KW.

Steven named the genus Callipeltis and some 30 species, including:Allium guttatumColchicum laetumCorispermum pallasiiCrambe cordifoliaOrchis punctulataQuercus hartwissianaTilia dasystylaReferences
 Translation of the article in French Wikipedia

External links
 Alexander von Nordmann (1865)    Christian Steven, der Nestor der Botaniker'', in Bull. Soc. Imp. Nat. Mosc, B. XXXVIII, 1–2, p. 100 sq.

Russian lepidopterists
19th-century botanists from the Russian Empire
1781 births
1863 deaths
Saint Petersburg State University alumni
S.M. Kirov Military Medical Academy alumni
Members of the Royal Swedish Academy of Sciences
Full members of the Saint Petersburg Academy of Sciences
Honorary members of the Saint Petersburg Academy of Sciences
Biologists from the Russian Empire
Finnish biologists
People from the Russian Empire of Swiss descent
Finnish people from the Russian Empire
Finnish people of Swiss descent
Recipients of the Order of St. Anna, 2nd class
Recipients of the Order of St. Vladimir, 3rd class
People from Hamina